Steven R. Carter was an American literary critic, and academic.

Life
He graduated from Denison University, and from Ohio State University with an MA, and Ph.D.  
He taught at University of North Carolina Wilmington, University of Sassari, University of Puerto Rico. He taught at Salem State College.

His papers are held at University of Illinois.

Awards
 1992 American Book Award

Works

References

Denison University alumni
Ohio State University alumni
University of North Carolina at Wilmington faculty
Academic staff of the University of Sassari
University of Puerto Rico faculty
Salem State University faculty
American Book Award winners
Year of birth missing (living people)
Living people